Welcome to the Madhouse is the debut studio album by Australian singer and songwriter Tones and I, released on 16 July 2021 through Bad Batch Records. The album debuted at number 1 on the ARIA Charts.

At the 2021 ARIA Music Awards, the album was nominated for Album of the Year and Best Artist,  while Giulia Giannini McGauran & Mitchell Eaton were nominated for Best Cover Art for their work on this album.

At the J Awards of 2021, the album was nominated for Australian Album of the Year.

Background
Welcome to the Madhouse is Watson's debut album, and her first body of work since her debut EP The Kids Are Coming (2019), which featured the commercially successful single "Dance Monkey". In an interview with MTV News, she said the album would be predominantly self-produced, saying: "These songs are completely me and my own production. It's not swayed by other songwriters or by anyone that's trying to help me get a hit, because that's never been important to me."

Watson chose to add five additional songs to the record as a result of having spare time to do so. She stated: "I've taken the time to just really make sure it's what I want. And I want to add more music to the album. It will be my first ever album, so I really want to make sure I'm proud of it."

Recording
Watson began recording for her debut album in early 2020, before suffering delays as a result of the Stage Four lockdown in Melbourne, which was enforced due to the COVID-19 pandemic. Elaborating in an interview about the recording sessions, Watson stated: "I couldn't record a lot of the time in Melbourne; I wasn't allowed to leave the house. The music I wrote before I had to stop, because of the really intense lockdown, was really weird!
I wrote this song called "Welcome to the Madhouse"; I just wrote three or four really weird songs, that I'd never written like that before. I explained it like trying to pull inspiration from living Groundhog Day over and over again!" She went on to finish recording for the album following the end of the lockdown.

Release
On 25 February 2020, Billboard revealed that Watson was finalising her debut album.

On 1 September 2020, Watson revealed details of her forthcoming album on an online press conference, stating that she planned to release the album sometime in the forthcoming two to three months. She'd initially intended to release the album in August of that year.

On 13 November 2020, in an interview accompanying the premiere of "Fly Away" on Triple J's Breakfast with Bryce Mills, Watson revealed that the single was the first from her debut album.

On 13 May 2021, alongside the worldwide premiere of "Won't Sleep" on Triple J's Hobba & Hing, Watson confirmed the album and shared its title. She revealed the album's release date on 7 June 2021.

Promotion

Singles
Welcome to the Madhouse was preceded by three singles. "Fly Away" was released as the album's lead single on 13 November 2020 and peaked at number 4 on the ARIA Singles Chart. "Won't Sleep" was released as the album's second single on 14 May 2021 and peaked at number 77 on the ARIA Singles Chart. "Cloudy Day" was released as the album's third single on 10 June 2021 and peaked at number 31 on the ARIA Singles Chart.

Track listing

Personnel
Credits are based on the deluxe version track listing.

 Toni Watson – vocals, all instruments
 Andrei Eremin – mastering
 Dann Hume – mixing (tracks 1, 4, 5, 9, 11–13), programming (5)
 Randy Belculfine – mixing (2, 3, 6–8, 14, 15), engineering (1–3, 6–8, 11–15)
 Konstantin Kersting – mixing (10, 16, 18–20), engineering (16, 18–20)
 Kenny Harmon – mixing, engineering (17)
 Daniel Frizza – engineering (1, 2, 6, 11)
 Richard Stolz – engineering (1, 4, 9, 10)
 Garrett Kato – vocal engineering (16)
 The Cho1r – choir (1, 2, 6)

Charts

Weekly charts

Year-end charts

Certifications

Release history

References

2021 debut albums
Tones and I albums
Albums postponed due to the COVID-19 pandemic
Albums produced by Dann Hume
Albums produced by Tones and I
Impact of the COVID-19 pandemic on the music industry
Sony Music Australia albums